Robyn Woodhouse (born 26 July 1943) is a former female track and field athlete from Australia, who mainly competed in the high jump event during her career. She represented her native country at the 1964 Summer Olympics, and won the gold medal in high jump at the 1962 British Empire and Commonwealth Games in Perth, Western Australia.

She was born in New South Wales.

References

External links
sports-reference

1943 births
Living people
Sportswomen from New South Wales
Australian female high jumpers
Olympic athletes of Australia
Athletes (track and field) at the 1964 Summer Olympics
Commonwealth Games gold medallists for Australia
Commonwealth Games bronze medallists for Australia
Commonwealth Games medallists in athletics
Athletes (track and field) at the 1962 British Empire and Commonwealth Games
Athletes (track and field) at the 1966 British Empire and Commonwealth Games
20th-century Australian women
21st-century Australian women
Medallists at the 1962 British Empire and Commonwealth Games
Medallists at the 1966 British Empire and Commonwealth Games